Calonge is a municipality in the comarca of the Baix Empordà in Catalonia, Spain, on the coastline of the Costa Brava.

The town comprises two parts, a medieval hill village and modern seaside resort.  The main urban centre and original village is about 4 km inland from the Bay of Sant Antoni.  The towers and walls of Calonge castle date from the thirteenth century.

Sant Antoni de Calonge, a resort, lies on the coast between Sant Feliu de Guíxols and Palamós.

The two parts are connected by GI-660 which then leads north through Las Gavarres mountains
to La Bisbal d'Empordà.  The C-31, the main north-south route through the Costa Brava splits the two parts.

Some of the bests campsites of the Costa Brava are located here, such as Cala Gogo, Treumal and International Calonge.

Demography

References

 Panareda Clopés, Josep Maria; Rios Calvet, Jaume; Rabella Vives, Josep Maria (1989). Guia de Catalunya, Barcelona: Caixa de Catalunya.  (Spanish).  (Catalan).

External links
 Government data pages 

Municipalities in Baix Empordà
Populated places in Baix Empordà